The Great Council of Chiefs was a constitutional body in Fiji from 1876 to March 2012. In April 2007, the council was suspended, due to an unworkable relationship with Frank Bainimarama, leader of an "interim government" that came to power through military coup in December 2006. It was formally disestablished by decree in March 2012.

It was different from the House of Chiefs, a larger body that includes all hereditary chiefs, although membership of the two bodies overlapped to a considerable extent. The Great Council of Chiefs in its most recent form was established under Section 116 of the now-defunct 1997 Constitution, but it actually predated the Constitution by many years, having been established by the British colonial rulers as an advisory body in 1876, two years after Fiji was ceded to the United Kingdom.

Institutional history
The Council was established in 1876 under the governorship of Sir Arthur Gordon. The decision was taken following consultations with chiefs, who advised Sir Arthur on how best to govern the colony's indigenous population. In the words of anthropologist Robert Norton, it "embodied the privileged relationship of trust and protection established between the Fijians and the British".

During the colonial era, meetings of the Great Council of Chiefs were held every year or two, "with rich ceremonial protocol", and chaired by the British governor. Council members advised the governor with regards to policy on indigenous affairs, and, until 1963, selected indigenous representatives for the colonial Parliament. Among its nominees to Parliament in the 1950s and early 1960s were Ratu Sir Lala Sukuna, Ratu Sir Kamisese Mara, Ratu George Cakobau, Ratu Edward Cakobau and Ratu Penaia Ganilau, who were to ascend to positions of leadership in government. In 1963, this function of the Council was abolished as indigenous Fijians obtained the right to elect their representatives to Parliament.

In the 1950s, the Council ceased to be reserved for chiefs; its "membership [...] was broadened to allow representation of trade unions and other urban organizations". All members remained indigenous, however.

Fiji's first Constitution, adopted upon independence in 1970, gave the Council the right to nominate eight of the twenty-two members of the Senate.

Following the 1987 military coup conducted by Sitiveni Rabuka, the Council reverted to being an exclusively aristocratic body, its membership reserved to high chiefs. Rabuka argued that hereditary chiefs should retain paramount decision-making power.

The 1990 Constitution thus enhanced the Council's power. It was now authorised to appoint 24 of the Senate's 34 members, making the Senate a GCC-dominated body. The Council would also, henceforth, appoint the President of Fiji and the Vice-President.

The 1997 Constitution reduced its representation in the Senate to 14 members (out of 32), but recognised its right to name President and Vice-President.

Recent history of the Council 
From the late 1980s onwards, the Great Council of Chiefs was compromised by manipulation from the government. Following the coup of 2000, however, it worked, with mixed success, to regain its independence. In 2001, it dismissed 1987 coup leader and former Prime Minister Sitiveni Rabuka from the chairmanship, in the midst of allegations about his possible involvement in the coup of 2000. It also cut its former ties with the Soqosoqo ni Vakavulewa ni Taukei (which it originally sponsored in the early 1990s), and declared its intention to eschew party politics in the future, although individual members of the Council would, of course, remain free to participate in politics as individuals.

In June 2004, the Great Council of Chiefs was plunged into crisis when the government decided not to reappoint Ratu Epeli Ganilau as one of its six representatives on the Great Council; the Cakaudrove Provincial Council did not give him one of their three seats either. These decisions had the effect of prematurely ending Ganilau's term as Chairman of the Council, as its regulations require the chairman to be a member. It is thought that Ganilau's open disagreement with several senior government figures, including Vice-President Ratu Jope Seniloli and Information Minister Simione Kaitani, along with fears that he was undermining the neutrality of the Great Council to use it as a platform from which to advance his own political ambitions, were factors in the Cakaudrove Provincial Council's decision. He was replaced by Ratu Ovini Bokini, who was thought to be more sympathetic to the government. Bokini was re-elected to a full three-year term on 27 July 2005, and Sakiusa Makutu of Nadroga-Navosa was chosen as his Deputy, succeeding Ro Jone Mataitini, who decided not to seek re-election.

Despite Fiji's membership of the Commonwealth of Nations at that time as a republic, the Great Council recognised Queen Elizabeth II as its traditional Queen or paramount chief.

On 20 April 2005, the Fijian government announced plans to grant greater formal powers to the Great Council. This proposal was immediately opposed by Fiji Labour Party leader Mahendra Chaudhry, who said it would lead to "dual government" in Fiji, and also drew criticism from Ratu Epeli Ganilau. The former Chairman of the Great Council, now the interim president of the National Alliance Party, said that he believed that the powers of the Council were already sufficient.

In a controversial move, the Great Council decided on 28 July 2005 to endorse the government's Reconciliation, Tolerance, and Unity Bill, which aimed to establish a commission empowered to compensate victims and pardon perpetrators of the 2000 coup. Opponents, including former Great Council chairman Ganilau, said that it was just a legal device to free government supporters who had been convicted and imprisoned on coup-related charges.

Suspension, and projected revival
The Council was suspended in April 2007 by Commodore Frank Bainimarama, author of the December 2006 military coup. It was not, however, abolished. In February 2008, the interim government announced that Bainimarama, as Minister for Indigenous Affairs, was appointing himself chairman of the Council. As chairman, he would appoint all other members, acting on the recommendation of the provincial councils, and would have the authority to discipline, suspend, or dismiss any member.

The interim government asked provinces to submit nominees for the Great Council of Chiefs by 15 July 2008. If certain provinces did not provide nominees, Bainimarama would name GCC members to represent those provinces himself.

On 5 August 2008, it was announced that the Great Council of Chiefs was ready to reconvene. It would be composed of three chiefs from each of the fourteen provinces, and would be chaired by the Minister for Fijian Affairs, who at that time was Commodore Bainimarama.

Disestablishment
On 14 March 2012, Bainimarama announced that President Ratu Epeli Nailatikau had "approved decrees that formally de-establish the Great Council of the Chiefs". He accused the Council of having "become politicized to the detriment of Fiji's pursuit of a common and equal citizenry".

Composition of the Council 
The Great Council had most recently consisted of 55 members, mainly hereditary chiefs along with some specially qualified commoners. The composition was as follows:

 The President of Fiji (ex officio)
 The Vice-President of Fiji (ex officio)
 The Prime Minister of Fiji (ex officio)
 6 members appointed by the President, on the advice of the Minister for Fijian Affairs
 42 provincial councillors (3 chosen by each of Fiji's 14 provincial councils)
 3 representatives of the Council of Rotuma
 1 life member (Sitiveni Rabuka)

These arrangements came into being on 9 June 1990. Previously, 22 parliamentarians holding seats allocated to indigenous Fijians held membership ex officio in the Great Council of Chiefs, along with 2 or 3 representatives from each of the 14 provincial councils. In addition, there were 8 chiefs and 7 commoners chosen by the Minister for Fijian Affairs. Following two military coups in 1987, the Council decided to abolish the right of elected parliamentarians to hold ex officio council membership, and to reduce the number of government appointees.

Except for the life member, all members served four-year terms.

The Council also recognised Elizabeth II, former Queen of Fiji, as Paramount Chief, but she was not formally a member of the Council.

Constitutional role 
According to the Constitution, the Great Council of Chiefs had two major powers:
It functioned as an electoral college to elect the president and vice-president of Fiji, for a five-year term. In certain circumstances prescribed by the Constitution, it might remove the president or vice-president from office, in the case of felony, incompetence, negligence, or being unable to carry out their constitutional duties.
It chose 14 of the 32 members of the Senate. (Although senators were ceremonially appointed by the president, his role was a mere formality: the Constitution obligated him to accept and appoint the 14 nominees chosen by the council, as well as 18 senators nominated by other institutions (Prime Minister 9, Leader of the Opposition 8, Council of Rotuma 1). Filling nearly half of the seats in the Senate, the nominees of the Great Council of Chiefs had an effective veto if they voted as a block, as they were almost certain to be joined by enough of the other senators to muster a majority. They did not always vote as a block, however: Fiji's chiefs are a very diverse body. In practice, the Great Council of Chiefs delegated its prerogative of choosing Senators to Fiji's fourteen provincial councils, with each province choosing one senator.

In addition to these constitutionally mandated functions, the Great Council of Chiefs had other roles that might from time to time be prescribed by law. In addition, it was considered almost compulsory for the government to consult and secure the approval of the Council before making major changes to the Constitution, although nothing in the Constitution required it to do so.

References

12. Great Council of Chiefs – A Colonial Legacy Created to Protect The Supremacy of Bau | url= http://fijisun.com.fj/2015/09/29/the-politics-of-fiji-a-way-forward-for-itaukei-people/

External links
 ABC.net.au: events with the Great Council of Chiefs (GCC)

Fijian chiefs
Organisations based in Fiji
Politics of Fiji
Organizations established in 1876
Organizations disestablished in 2012
1876 establishments in Fiji
2012 disestablishments in Fiji